"Tango in the Night" is a song by British-American rock band Fleetwood Mac from their album of the same name. Although "Tango in the Night" was not released as a single, it received airplay and reached No. 28 on the Billboard Album Rock Tracks chart. However, the title track was overshadowed by the album's hit singles.

Background
Following the release Lindsey Buckingham's second album, Go Insane, the guitarist began crafting songs for what he intended to be his third solo album. Among the songs recorded for the album was "Tango in the Night". By late 1985, Fleetwood Mac reconvened to record a new studio album, so Buckingham allowed the band to include the song as the title track.

While the musical arrangement was completed before the Tango sessions, the lyrics had yet to be fully developed. An early demo of the song, included on the deluxe edition of Tango in the Night, featured a trembling vocal line at the end of every chorus, which was eventually incorporated into another Buckingham-penned track, "Caroline".

Personnel
Fleetwood Mac
 Christine McVie – keyboards, synthesizer
 Lindsey Buckingham – lead vocals, guitars, keyboards, Fairlight CMI sampling synthesizer, lap harp, percussion, programming
 John McVie – bass guitar
 Mick Fleetwood – drums, percussion

Charts

References

Fleetwood Mac songs
1987 songs
1987 singles
Songs written by Lindsey Buckingham
Song recordings produced by Richard Dashut
Warner Records singles